Maja Benedičič (born 27 January 1982) is a Slovenian cross-country skier. She competed in four events at the 2006 Winter Olympics.

Cross-country skiing results
All results are sourced from the International Ski Federation (FIS).

Olympic Games

World Championships

World Cup

Season standings

References

External links

1982 births
Living people
Slovenian female cross-country skiers
Olympic cross-country skiers of Slovenia
Cross-country skiers at the 2006 Winter Olympics
Sportspeople from Kranj